RÚV is the main television channel of RÚV, the Icelandic public broadcaster, launched in 1966. The free-to-air channel broadcasts primarily news, sports, entertainment, cultural programs, children's material, original Icelandic programming as well as American, British and Nordic content. Among its highest-rated programs are the comedy sketch show Spaugstofan, mystery drama Ófærð (Trapped) and Fréttir (News).

It is the Icelandic Olympic Broadcaster and has also usually holds rights to the FIFA World Cup and UEFA Euro competitions. It is a member of the European Broadcasting Union and is responsible for selecting Iceland's entries to the Eurovision Song Contest.

History 

The network made its first transmission on 30 September 1966 on channel. To begin with, transmissions only took place on Wednesdays and Fridays, only gradually expanding to the rest of the week through the years, but there were no transmissions on Thursdays. In addition, no television was broadcast in July. Transmissions in July began in 1983. Sjónvarpið was the first public television channel in Iceland and also the first to broadcast in the Icelandic language, although Armed Forces Radio and Television Service Keflavik (is) broadcast an English language television service from Naval Air Station Keflavik from 1951 until the latter's closure in 2006. Having lost its monopoly and sharing the market with Stöð 2 a year before, Sjónvarpið ended the era of television-free Thursdays on 1 October 1987, resulting in the first full week of television in Iceland.

While the first station was headquartered in Reykjavík, repeaters were installed over the next years in Vestmannaeyjar (channel 5, on 30 September 1966), Stykkishólmur (channel 3, on 17 May 1967), Skálafell (channel 4, on 22 December 1967), Hoffell (channel 7, on 23 December 1967), Vaðlaheiði (channel 6, on 1 December 1968) and Hegranes (channel 8, on 13 December 1968).

Test colour transmission commenced in 1973 and started full-time in 1976. From September 1981 onwards, the channel greatly benefited from Iceland's connection to the rest of the world via satellite. Starting on March 1, 1982, Icelandic television viewers were able to watch daily reports from abroad on their evening newscast. Live broadcasts from the rest of Europe, such as the Eurovision Song Contest, commenced for the first time in May 1986. RÚV's teletext service, Textavarp, was inaugurated on the 25th anniversary of Icelandic television in 1991.

As late as 2000, television only aired for 8 hours each day, starting at around 4:35 pm and ending at around 12:35 am on weekdays. The number of hours of television aired per week changes every week and day, with transmissions during the weekend being the longest. RÚV currently starts at 7 am on Saturdays and Sundays. During the week, however, transmissions still start between 3 pm and 5:30 pm and end between midnight and 1:30 am. During downtime, the station carries its daily schedule and a news ticker, complete with audio from Rás 2.

Test cards 

From the inauguration of Sjónvarpið in 1966 until as late as 1982, an electronically generated, heavily modified version of the Philips PM5540 monochrome test card was utilised during off-air hours, with the words Ríkisútvarpið SJÓNVARP occasionally appearing in the top and bottom black segments respectively.

In the early-1970s, the Philips PM5544 test card was introduced for colour transmissions and gradually replaced the previous monochrome test card, with the time and date included in the PM5544 test card from 1995 to 2000 and again from 2002 to 2006. In 2009, the Philips PM5644 widescreen test card was introduced to replace its PM5544 forerunner. In 2011, the test card was discontinued when an overnight filler programme similar to ITV Nightscreen was introduced during RÚV's off-air hours.

Broadcasting standards 
Since its establishment in 1966, RÚV broadcast using the analogue 625-line PAL standard over the very high frequency band until the analogue switchoff in 2015.

Preparations for high-definition television (HDTV) broadcasts began in 2012, when two new 1080i play-out systems were installed. Digital HDTV broadcasts commenced in 2014 following an agreement signed with Vodafone Iceland on 27 March 2013 to install and run two new shared digital multiplexes using DVB-T/T2 over ultra high frequency bands, with 99.9% population coverage.

RÚV has been available over broadband and fibre Internet Protocol television systems of Síminn and Vodafone Iceland, since their inception in 2004.

In 2007, RÚV began direct satellite TV broadcasts using the Thor 5 satellite over DVB-S, in order to service fishing fleets around Iceland and remote areas where the terrestrial network does not reach. Telenor ASA runs the service by contract until 2028, this service is encrypted and is only available on request.

Broadcasts were also previously available over Vodafone Iceland's Multichannel Multipoint Distribution Service and Síminn Breiðband cable TV services, which have both been discontinued.

Programming 
RÚV broadcasts various original and foreign programming. Recent programming that RÚV has produced or contributed is listed as follows (recurring and one-off):

Recurring 
Fréttir, the main news programme at 7 p.m.
Kastljós, a news/talk programme (similar to Newsnight)
Kveikur, an explanatory news programme (similar to BBC's Panorama)
Gettu betur, a long-running game/quiz show
Vikan með Gísla Marteini, an entertainment/talk show
Landinn, a programme about rural locations in Iceland
Áramótaskaupið, a New Year's Eve comedy special with an audience of up to 90% of viewers
Jóladagatal Sjónvarpsins, an ongoing series of televised Advent calendars.
Stundin Okkar

Other original programming 
 Verbúðin (Blackport), a series set in the 1980s in the Westfjords.
 Brot (The Valhalla Murders)
Ófærð (Trapped), a mystery drama series set in Seyðisfjörður.
Ráðherran (The Minister)
Latibær (LazyTown)
 Spaugstofan
 Sigla himinfley, a 4-part drama mini-series

See also 
 Television in Iceland
 List of Icelandic television channels
 RÚV

References 

Television channels in Iceland
Television channels and stations established in 1966
Companies based in Reykjavík
1966 establishments in Iceland
Television in Iceland